The Tibetan eared pheasant (Crossoptilon harmani), also called Elwes' eared pheasant, is a species of bird in the family Phasianidae found in southeast Tibet and adjacent northern India, usually between  elevation, but has been seen down to  in winter.

Their natural habitats are boreal and temperate forests. Seen in bushy and grassy clearings, rhododendron thickets, and tall dense scrub in valleys, these birds are threatened by habitat destruction and hunting. They form monogamous pair bonds in the spring. Their eggs are laid from May to July, and incubated by the females.

Description
The Tibetan eared pheasant shares many characteristics, such as the short ears and the droopy tail, with the white eared pheasant (C. crossoptilon), as well as having similar calls and hybridising with it in the Salween Valley, so the two may be conspecific. The sexes are similar. The beak is reddish-brown, the irises yellowish-orange, and the bare facial skin is red, as are the legs. The head is topped with a crown of black, dense, short feathers, on either side of which are short, nonprojecting ear tufts. The rest of the head and nape and a thin collar are white. The rest of the body, wings, and tail are bluish-grey, the mantle, neck and breast being of a darker shade, whereas the lower back, rump, upper tail coverts, and belly are paler whitish-grey. The wings are blackish-brown and the tail bluish-black.

Distribution and habitat
Their range is restricted to Tibet, northern India, and northern Bhutan. Their typical habitat is dense scrubby areas in river valleys, grassy hillsides, and the verges of both coniferous and deciduous woodlands.

Ecology
These pheasants usually form groups of up to 10 individuals. They feed on the ground, foraging through the plant debris and grasses near woodland edges and among the rhododendron and juniper scrub. In areas where they are hunted, they may be elusive, retreating into the undergrowth or flying off downhill when scared, but where unmolested, can be quite bold. The birds are believed to be monogamous, with breeding taking place between May and July. One nest was discovered under a fallen tree trunk; it was made from bark and pulp with a mossy lining. The female seems to be solely responsible for incubating the eggs, but both sexes have been observed feeding the chicks.

Status
C. harmani is rated by the International Union for Conservation of Nature as being a "near-threatened species" because its natural habitat is being cleared, and in many areas, the birds are hunted. Another factor in the possible decline of the population is a reduction in the number of suitable places for roosting.

References

Tibetan eared pheasant
Birds of Tibet
Tibetan eared pheasant
Taxonomy articles created by Polbot